The 2011–12 Bill Beaumont Cup (Rugby Union County Championship) was the 112th edition of England's County Championship rugby union club competition. 

Hertfordshire won their first title after defeating Lancashire in the final.

Final

See also
 English rugby union system
 Rugby union in England

References

Rugby Union County Championship
County Championship (rugby union) seasons